Gregor Blatnik (born 15 December 1972) is a Slovenian retired international footballer who played as a defender.

Career
Blatnik was capped twice by the Slovenian national team between 1993 and 1995.

References

External links
 Player profile at NZS 
 

1972 births
Living people
Slovenian footballers
Association football defenders
NK Celje players
NK Korotan Prevalje players
NK Mura players
Slovenian PrvaLiga players
Slovenia international footballers
Slovenia under-21 international footballers